Chesterton Academy is a private, co-ed, Catholic secondary school in Hopkins, Minnesota, United States.  It is located in the Roman Catholic Archdiocese of Saint Paul and Minneapolis.

Launched in the fall of 2008 by Dale Ahlquist and Tom Bengtson, the school is centered on G. K. Chesterton’s ideas of integrated learning. It offers summer school programs, options for home-schooled students, and adult enrichment classes.

Chesterton Academy has been recognized as one of the "Top 50 Catholic High Schools for excellence in Catholic identity, academics and civics education" by the Cardinal Newman Society.

Chesterton Academy has several campuses around the United States. Besides Hopkins, there is one in Saint Paul, Omaha, Chicago, Milwaukee, and Buffalo, New York. There is also a campus in Italy, whose students have sometimes visited the Edina campus. Chesterton Academy also sometimes receives foreign exchange students.

References

External links
Chesterton Academy Website

Educational institutions established in 2008
Roman Catholic Archdiocese of Saint Paul and Minneapolis
Catholic secondary schools in Minnesota
Schools in Hennepin County, Minnesota
2008 establishments in Minnesota